Damien Freeleagus is a Brisbane-born actor whose credits include the films Jucy (2010) and Primal (2010). He also directed the short film Bird Therapy which was a Tropfest finalist in 2011.

Select Credits
All My Friends Are Leaving Brisbane (2007)
Primal (2010)
Home and Away
Jucy (2010)
Bird Therapy (2011) - short (also directed)

References

External links

Australian male film actors
Year of birth missing (living people)
Living people
21st-century Australian male actors